Oscar William Adams Sr. (October 24, 1882 – May 14, 1946) was a journalist and publisher in the United States. He published the Birmingham Reporter. His son Oscar William Adams Jr. became an Alabama Supreme Court Justice.

He was from Gulfcrest, Alabama. Adams and his brother Frank were members of the Knights of Pythias.

He graduated from Normal A&M College in Normal, Alabama.

References

20th-century American newspaper publishers (people)
20th-century American journalists
American male journalists
20th-century African-American people
African-American journalists
Alabama A&M University alumni
People from Mobile County, Alabama
1882 births
1946 deaths